Heid may refer to:

Heid (name)
Lake Heid, a lake in Grisons, Switzerland
Heiðr, a seeress and witch in Norse mythology